In aircraft design, a stepless cockpit means that the nose of the aircraft has no separate "windscreen" panels directly in front of the pilot's or co-pilot's seating positions, and generally has no "breaks" in the nose contour – curved or otherwise – from their absence. In the conventional design, the pilot's cabin is a different part of the aircraft than the nose. The stepless design is believed to help make the plane more aerodynamic thus aiding speed and fuel efficiency. The stepless design did, however, present serious challenges to the inclusion of a nose-mount turreted gun position, in eras where manned or remotely-aimed gun turrets were still important for a bomber's defensive needs.

Gallery

 

Aircraft configurations